Southern Province (also known as South Province) was an electorate of the Victorian Legislative Council.

Southern Province was created in 1856, after the colony of Victoria obtained self-government. It was one of the six original Legislative Council provinces of the newly established bicameral Victorian Parliament. Southern Province was finally abolished in 1970, after Boronia Province and Templestowe Province were created in 1967.

Members for Southern Province
The Victorian Legislative Council was the upper house the Victorian Parliament. The province was initially represented by five members. That was reduced to three after the redistribution of provinces in 1882, when South Eastern, South Yarra, North Yarra, North Eastern, North Central, Melbourne East, Melbourne North, Melbourne South, Melbourne West and Wellington Provinces were created. After 1904, when more provinces were created, the representation was reduced to two.

Prior to self-government, Donald Kennedy had been a nominated member of the unicameral Victorian Legislative Council, from September 1854 to March 1856.

In 1882, after the new provinces were created, James Balfour was elected for South Western Province from 1882 to 1904, and James Buchanan was elected for South Eastern Province from 1882 to 1898.

After Southern Province was abolished, Raymond Garrett represented Templestowe Province, from 1970 to 1976.

Election results

References

Former electoral provinces of Victoria (Australia)
1856 establishments in Australia
1970 disestablishments in Australia